Ardozyga chionoprora is a species of moth in the family Gelechiidae. It was described by Turner in 1927. It is found in Australia, where it has been recorded from Tasmania.

References

Ardozyga
Moths described in 1927
Moths of Australia